State Road 10 (SR 10) is an east–west road in northwest Indiana.  Its western terminus is at the Illinois state line west of Lake Village.  Its eastern terminus is at State Road 19 (SR 19) south of Etna Green.

Route description

From its western terminus at the Illinois state line, SR 10 heads east; after  it has an intersection with U.S. Route 41 (US 41).  SR 10 then has an interchange with Interstate 65 (I-65) at exit number 230 on I-65.  After I-65, SR 10 has an intersection with State Road 110 and SR 10 heads due north.  Then SR 10 turns east onto U.S. Route 231 and both routes go due east until US 231 turns due south on its way to Lafayette.  SR 10 continues due east toward U.S. Route 421 (US 421), passing through Wheatfield where it meets State Road 49 (SR 49).  At US 421, SR 10 turns north onto US 421.  After a short concurrency with US 421, SR 10 turns east.  Then SR 10 meets U.S. Route 35 (US 35); SR 10 and US 35 have a short concurrency heading southeast.  Then SR 10 leaves US 35 to the north, northeast, and then east.  Near Argos SR 10 has an intersection with U.S. Route 31 (US 31).  After US 31, heads east to its eastern terminus at SR 19.

History

From 1918 to 1926, SR 10 followed a portion of the route of the modern U.S. Route 41 (US 41).  This route was part of the old number system that was in place in Indiana.  The current SR 10 route was designated SR 50 from Wheatfield to Argos; the rest was made up of unnumbered roads. Then in 1926, SR 10 changed to its current route. In the early 1960s, SR 10 was rerouted onto US 35 near Bass Lake and at that time State Road 210 (SR 210) was decommissioned.

Major intersections

References

External links

010
Transportation in Jasper County, Indiana
Transportation in Newton County, Indiana
Transportation in Starke County, Indiana
Transportation in Marshall County, Indiana
U.S. Route 41